is a Japanese manga series written and illustrated by Yura Urushibara. It has been serialized in Akita Shoten's shōnen manga magazine Weekly Shōnen Champion since June 2020.

Publication
Akita Shoten has collected its chapters into individual tankōbon volumes. The first volume was released on October 8, 2020. As of January 6, 2023, thirteen volumes have been released.

The series has been licensed in France by Kana, and in Italy by Panini Comics.

Volume list

Reception
The manga was nominated for the 2021 Next Manga Awards in the print category. As of February 2022, the first eight volumes had over 1.2 million copies in circulation. By November 2022, the first twelve volumes had over 1.85 million copies in circulation.

References

Adventure anime and manga
Akita Shoten manga
Dark fantasy anime and manga
Shōnen manga